DPT-Hib vaccine is a combination vaccine whose generic name is diphtheria and tetanus toxoids and whole-cell pertussis vaccine adsorbed with Hib conjugate vaccine, sometimes abbreviated to DPT-Hib. It protects against the infectious diseases diphtheria, tetanus, pertussis, and Haemophilus influenzae type B.

A branded formulation was marketed in the US as Tetramune by Lederle Praxis Biologicals (subsequently acquired by Wyeth). Tetramune has since been discontinued.

References

Vaccines
Combination drugs
Combination vaccines
Diphtheria
Tetanus
Whooping cough
Haemophilus